100 Years… 100 Cheers: America's Most Inspiring Movies is a list of the most inspiring films as determined by the American Film Institute. It is part of the AFI 100 Years… series, which has been compiling lists of the greatest films of all time in various categories since 1998.  It was unveiled on a three-hour prime time special on CBS television on June 14, 2006.

The films were selected by a jury of over 1,500 people involved in the 
film industry, who were polled in November 2005.

The list

References

External links
 AFI's 100 Years...100 Cheers
 List of the 100 winning cheers films.
 List of the 300 nominated films.

AFI 100 Years... series